Evan Thompson (born 1962) is a professor of philosophy at the University of British Columbia. He writes about cognitive science, phenomenology, philosophy of mind, and cross-cultural philosophy, especially Buddhist philosophy in dialogue with Western philosophy of mind and cognitive science.

Life

As a child, Thompson was home-schooled at the Lindisfarne Association, a think tank and retreat founded by his father, William Irwin Thompson. In 1977, Thompson met Chilean phenomenologist Francisco Varela when Varela attended a Lindisfarne conference which was organized by Thompson Senior and Gregory Bateson. Thompson received a Ph.D. in Philosophy from the University of Toronto in 1990 and an A.B. in Asian Studies from Amherst College in 1983.

Career

Thompson has taught at the University of Toronto, Concordia University, Boston University, and York University. While at York University, Thompson was also a member of the Centre for Vision Research. Thompson has held visiting appointments at the Center for Subjectivity Research in Copenhagen, and at the University of Colorado, Boulder. Thompson worked with Francisco Varela at CREA (Centre de Recherche en Epistemologie Appliquée) at the Ecole Polytechnique in Paris. During this time, Varela and Thompson, along with Eleanor Rosch, wrote The Embodied Mind: Cognitive Science and Human Experience, which introduced the approach to cognitive science known as enactivism. Thompson's book, Mind in Life: Biology, Phenomenology, and the Sciences of Mind, argues for a deep continuity between life and mind. In 2020, Thompson published Why I Am Not A Buddhist, which argues against what he calls Buddhist exceptionalism, "the belief that Buddhism is superior to other religions...or that Buddhism isn't really a religion but rather is a kind of 'mind science,' therapy, philosophy, or a way of life based on meditation."

Works
Francisco Varela, Evan Thompson, and Eleanor Rosch, The Embodied Mind: Cognitive Science and Human Experience. MIT Press, 1991.
Colour Vision: A Study in Cognitive Science and the Philosophy of Perception Routledge Press, 1995
Between Ourselves: Second Person Issues in the Study of Consciousness. Imprint Academic, 2001. Published also as a special triple issue of the Journal of Consciousness Studies
Alva Noe and Evan Thompson, eds., Vision and Mind: Selected Readings in the Philosophy of Perception. MIT Press, 2002.
The Problem of Consciousness: New Essays in Phenomenological Philosophy of Mind. Canadian Journal of Philosophy, Supplementary Volume 29: 2003. University of Alberta Press
Giovanna Colombetti and Evan Thompson, eds., Emotion Experience. Imprint Academic, 2005. Published also as a special triple issue of the Journal of Consciousness Studies
The Cambridge Handbook of Consciousness. Edited by Philip David Zelazo, Morris Moscovitch, Evan Thompson, May 2007 Cambridge University Press: Cambridge Handbooks in Psychology series, 
Mind in Life: Biology, Phenomenology, and the Sciences of Mind. Harvard University Press, 2010, 
Waking, Dreaming, Being: Self and Consciousness in Neuroscience, Meditation, and Philosophy. Columbia University Press, 2014, 
Why I am Not a Buddhist. Yale University Press, 2020

See also 

Embodied mind
Waking Up: A Guide to Spirituality Without Religion by Sam Harris
Why Buddhism is True by Robert Wright.
Secular Buddhism

Notes

External links

Thompson's website

20th-century American non-fiction writers
20th-century American philosophers
21st-century American non-fiction writers
21st-century American philosophers
1962 births
American male non-fiction writers
Fellows of the Royal Society of Canada
Living people
Philosophers of mind
Academic staff of the University of British Columbia
American Indologists
Amherst College alumni
Tibetan Buddhism writers
20th-century American male writers
21st-century American male writers